The Emirates Interbank Offered Rate (EIBOR), also abbreviated as EBOR, is a daily reference rate, published by the UAE Central Bank, based on the averaged interest rates at which UAE banks offer to lend unsecured funds to other banks in the United Arab Emirates dirham wholesale money market (or interbank market).

Calculation and Tenors 
As of 29 May 2015 fixing is conducted each business day excluding Saturdays at 11AM UAE time. The fixing rate is the average of the contributions excluding the two highest and two lowest contributions for each tenor.

As of 10 December 2013 the following tenors are calculated:
 Overnight
 1 Week
 1 Month
 3 Months
 6 Months
 12 Months

Contributing Banks 
As of January 2017 the following banks contribute to EIBOR:
 Abu Dhabi Commercial Bank
 Commercial Bank Of Dubai
 EmiratesNBD
 First Gulf Bank
 HSBC Bank Middle East
 MashreqBank
 National Bank Of Abu Dhabi
 National Bank Of Fujairah
 RAKBANK
 Standard Chartered Bank
 Union National Bank
 Arab Bank

References

Reference rates
https://www.centralbank.ae/en/services/eibor-prices